The 1984–85 NCAA football bowl games were a series of post-season games played in December 1984 and January 1985 to end the 1984 NCAA Division I-A football season. A total of 18 team-competitive games, and two all-star games, were played. The post-season began with the Independence Bowl on December 15, 1984, and concluded on January 12, 1985, with the season-ending Senior Bowl.

Schedule

References